Rosnówko  is a village in the administrative district of Gmina Komorniki, within Poznań County, Greater Poland Voivodeship, in west-central Poland. Through Rosnówko runs the national road #5, which conveniently connects the village with Poznań.

References

Villages in Poznań County